The Big 4 is a 2022 Indonesian action comedy film written and directed by Timo Tjahjanto. Released by Netflix on 15 December 2022, it tells the story of four retired assassins––played by Abimana Aryasatya, Lutesha, Arie Kriting, and Kristo Immanuel––who spring back into action when they cross paths with a straight-arrow cop (Putri Marino) who is determined to track down an elusive murderer.

Upon release, The Big 4 ranked within the top 10 most-watched titles in 53 countries, including in Indonesia, where it was the top-ranked film. Tjahjanto has expressed intentions to develop a sequel.

Synopsis
A by-the-book detective investigates the death of her father and follows a clue to a remote tropical island, only to find out his true identity as a leader of a group of assassins. Now hunted by his enemies, she has to team up with the crooks her father had trained––four retired, down-on-their-luck assassins itching to get back in the game.

Cast

 Abimana Aryasatya as Topan
 Putri Marino as Dina
 Lutesha as Alpha
 Arie Kriting as Jenggo
 Kristo Immanuel as Pelor
 Marthino Lio as Suranto/Antonio Sandoval
 Michelle Tahalea as Alo
 Michael Kho as Lengko and Vinsen
 Budi Ros as Petrus
 Adjie N.A. as Bunglon
 Donny Damara as Hassan
 Andri Mashadi as Rudha
 Willem Bevers as Syarief
 Gilbert Pattiruhu as Don
 Marsha Timothy as Lady Zero

Production 
Netflix's Director of Content for Southeast Asia, Malobika Banerji, announced the project in September 2021. Filming commenced the following November, with Tjahjanto revealing Aryasatya, Marino, Lutesha, Arie, Kristo, Lio, and Ros as cast members on Instagram. Citing a personal mission to highlight the Eastern part of Indonesia, Tjahjanto chose Bali and Timor as filming locations for the fictional Bersi island, where the majority of the film took place.

Release 
Trailer for the film was released in November 2022 ahead of its release on Netflix worldwide on 15 December 2022.

Reception

Audience viewership 
According to Variety, The Big 4 was the second most watched non-English language title on Netflix in its first weekend, making the top 10 in 53 countries, including Argentina, Finland, Greece, Mexico, the Philippines, Spain, South Korea, Taiwan, Thailand, and Vietnam, as well as topping the list in Indonesia.

Critical response 
As of 25 December 2022, the film has scores an 88% approval rating on Rotten Tomatoes.

Brian Tallerico of RogerEbert.com gives the film 3 out of 4 stars, calling it "The Three Stooges with bazookas" that "takes off [...] with enough rhythm to get you from the intense prologue to the insane final half-hour". Tallerico calls the cast "solid from top to bottom", singling out Aryasatya, Marino, and Lio, but criticizes the runtime and dialogue.

Johnny Loftus of Decider says the film benefits from a "solid cast" but criticizes the clunky setup, broadly comedic fights, and the "sequel tease". Roger Moore of Movie Nation is more critical, calling the film's plot "over-the-top and borderline nonsensical" but praises the action scenes and jokes.

References

External links
 
 
 

2022 films
2020s Indonesian-language films
2022 action films
2022 action comedy films
Indonesian-language Netflix original films
Indonesian martial arts films
Indonesian action comedy films
2020s police comedy films
Films shot in Indonesia